Manfred Schubert is a retired East German slalom canoeist who competed in the 1950s and 1960s. He won twelve medals at the ICF Canoe Slalom World Championships with four golds (C-1: 1957, 1961, 1963; C-1 team: 1963), six silvers (C-1: 1959; C-1 team: 1955, 1957, 1959, 1961, 1967), and two bronzes (C-1: 1965; C-1 team: 1965).

References

German male canoeists
Possibly living people
Year of birth missing (living people)
Medalists at the ICF Canoe Slalom World Championships